Sanil Sachar is a national best-selling author and a founding partner of Gurgaon-based incubator, Huddle. Sachar began his career as an author with Summer Promises and Other Poems, whilst pursuing a BSc (Hons) Sport Business Management from Sheffield Hallam University. He has since written, The Dark Side of Light and Rebound, under the publishing house, Rupa Publications, with his fourth book, And...Perhaps Love, with Penguin. A serial entrepreneur, Sanil is one of the co-owners of global sports brand, Trusox, the co-founder of a Gurgaon-based incubator, Huddle, and an active angel investor. A motivational speaker, Sachar has spoken at TED events, addressing audiences across the world, on a variety of subjects, mainly, creativity, innovation, and leadership, on which he writes articles as a guest columnist for publications.

There is not much known about the author's and entrepreneurs' personal lives, since they are kept private.

Education 
Sachar completed his education from Ackworth School once he moved to England at the age of 16. He studied in Delhi's Modern School, Vasant Vihar before he moved to Ackworth School. Sanil holds a BSC(Hons), Sport Business Management degree from Sheffield Hallam University and shortly after, went on to work with Star Sports, before choosing to start his own ventures.

Interests 
Sachar has been an avid sportsperson and was scouted to play football under the management of Scottish midfielder, Ronnie Glavin. After his graduation he secured a job with Star Sports as a market and revenue strategist. There is not much known about his personal life, but the author and entrepreneur has often publicly stated his learning arise from his love and passion for sports .

Books 
His first book named 'Summer Promises and Other Poems‘ was published in 2013 by Rupa Publications while he was in his first year at university. Sachar was launched into the literary world under the guidance of Lyricist, Javed Akhtar . In the year 2015, Sanil wrote his second book, 'The Dark Side of Light' which was well received by people all around the world[1][2][3]. Rebound is a mystery about a schizophrenic set in the backdrop of a love story, making it amongst the top 5 fictions in India . Sachar has then gone onto writing his fourth book with Penguin Random House India, titled, And...Perhaps Love

1. Summer Promises and Other Poems

Summer Promises and Other Poems is Sanil's first book which was published by Rupa Publications in April 2013. The book was launched by Lyricist Javed Akhtar and Indian politician, Manish Tewari in New Delhi. The book is a collection of 78 poems of various genres, traversing a wide range of subjects, from everyday emotions such as love, fame and failure to the occasional transformative moments. The book is not only an insight into the author's own life but also puts forward his perspective on the meaning of life and the various experiences it offers. As praised by Muzzafar Ali, this book is ‘a diary of living life in all its simplicity and immediacy. It is about growing to know things in the process of growing up with things.’

2. The Dark Side of Light
The Dark Side of Light written by Sanil Sachar consists of the combination of short stories, poems and plays, vignettes of romance, comedy, murder, mystery and much more. Offering a diverse pick, it seamlessly combines the rhythm of poetry, the allure of storytelling and the realism of theatre to create an enriching and vivid experience. Some pieces transport you to a different world, while others allude to everyday experiences. Set in the year 2034, ‘Members Only’ takes you inside India's first strip club and asks existential questions about a person's identity, through the story of a young man who oscillates between love and lust.

3. Rebound 

Rebound is the journey of Abhimanyu, a schizophrenic, who breaks free from the clutches of a trapped existence, only to find himself back in the same world.

Abhimanyu grows up in a circus, around masked faces, painted expressions and a make-believe world. Brought up by his uncle, the owner of a circus, Abhimanyu is fed with lies and surrounded by deception. His uncle lords over Abhimanyu's life and is happy to even sacrifice the young boy at the altar of his greed and ambition.

Finally, Abhimanyu musters the courage to leave the only place he can call home, but even after escaping, he feels completely lost in a world he knows nothing about. As he learns to accept his freedom, love strikes in the form of Rose. She gives him the reason to live and dream. However, love comes at a price. Rose is a circus entertainer and loving her means going back to the world he hated—circus. A life with the woman who provides him hope would mean confronting the demons inside Abhimanyu's head, as well as outside.

A tale of love, loss and longing, Rebound is also a young man's relentless pursuit to uncover delusions and seek a real life.

How does it end?

It doesn't.

4. And...Perhaps Love 
A new normal has replaced the established order. Distant relationships, virtual work, blurred futures and measuring our way back to this reality occupy us every day. Negotiating these changes, Sanil Sachar's And . . . Perhaps Love will work as your companion. It is a silent observer for when you want to read it, and a patient listener when you wish to communicate with it. Capturing the ideas of love, darkness and the attempt to find balance in life, this is a book for now and forever.

Co-Producer 
Sanil is also the co-producer of Mantra (released on 17 March 2017), which starred actors like, Rajat Kapoor, Kalki Koechlin and Lushin Dubey and was well received by the audience [1][2][3]and won the best feature film award at the South Asian Film Festival in New York [4].

Family

From New Delhi, Sanil Sachar is the son of Sita and Sanjiv Sachar, the grandson of Rajinder Sachar and the great-grandson of Bhim Sen Sachar .

References

 [11]

Living people
Poets from Delhi
Indian emigrants to the United Kingdom
1992 births
20th-century Indian poets